Lennia lena, the lesser recluse, is a species of butterfly in the family Hesperiidae. It is found in Ivory Coast, eastern Nigeria, Cameroon and Gabon. The habitat consists of dense forests.

References

Butterflies described in 1937
Erionotini